Singapore ice hockey league is an ice hockey league officially run by Amateur Ice Hockey Association of Singapore (AIHA Singapore), a member of the International Ice Hockey Federation.

External links 

 Amateur Ice Hockey Association Singapore
 Ice Dragons Hockey: Singapore Kids Hockey

Ice hockey in Singapore
Amateur ice hockey
Ice hockey leagues in Asia